"Is It Any Wonder?" is a song written and performed by English alternative rock band Keane, released as the second single from their second studio album, Under the Iron Sea. The single was released to the iTunes Store on 16 May and to shops on 29 May 2006. "Is It Any Wonder?" debuted at number 15 on the UK Singles Chart on 28 May 2006 based on download sales alone but reached number three with physical sales added on 4 June. The song was officially premiered on 17 April 2006 on Jo Whiley's BBC Radio 1 show. Soon after this, it was leaked onto the Internet.

The song was featured in the video games Madden NFL 07 and Dance Dance Revolution Universe 2. The song was nominated for the Best Pop Performance by a Duo or Group With Vocal for the 2007 Grammy Awards.

Composition and recording 
"Is It Any Wonder?" was composed by Tim Rice-Oxley in 2005, being first demoed the same year. The guitar effects originate from Tim's distorted Yamaha CP70 piano. An early demo appeared on the Under the Iron Sea DVD.
It was mainly recorded at The Magic Shop studios, New York City and programmed and engineered by Andy Green.

Musical structure 
"Is It Any Wonder?" was composed under an 8-beat  time signature and a 130-bpm tempo. The main key of the riff is A major, alternating to G major when the bass starts playing.

The song starts with bashing piano notes, leading to Tim-Rice Oxley's deep distortion piano sound that is used to emulate abrasive electric guitar riffs. Bass guitar lines, synthesizers, and drums begin to finally introduce Tom Chaplin with the vocals of the first verse. Rice-Oxley continues to play regular and distortion piano notes throughout the verses of the song. As with almost all Keane songs, it includes a bridge after the second chorus, preceding the outro. Live performances show several differences from the studio version. Firstly, the deep sound is changed for the same synthesizer used for the whole song, which is also quite different from the one of the studio album. During the first verse of the original version, a synthesizer is used as a background for Chaplin's singing. However, on the live performance, Rice-Oxley keeps playing his distorted Yamaha CP70 piano throughout the song, instead of the synthesizer. Finally, drumming on the main riffs is modified, with Hughes beating the crash cymbal again and again.

Meaning 
The song is about the Iraq War:

Music video 
Directed by Kevin Godley, the video is almost the same throughout the song. A camera moves along a metal track like a roller coaster. The camera runs through rails until the end of it, stopping again. Keane are in the middle of it, with Tom appearing sometimes on the scene. The CD+DVD edition of Under the Iron Sea includes a trailer for the making of the video, as well as the videoclip.

Cover art and packaging 
The cover artwork for the single was designed by Sanna Annukka Smith, a Finnish artist in March 2006. Sanna originally wanted a red bird crying and Keane wanted a lonely soldier. During the first two weeks of April, the cover showed a soldier but the definite version shows the red bird crying on the soldier's shoulder, with the soldier referring to war. Some versions didn't include the bird, like the first cover. The crying bird later appeared on the cover for "Try Again". Similar to the book-shaped box of the DVD for Under the Iron Sea, this biodegradable single's container is made of carbon neutral and recycled materials, without any plastics.

B-sides

"Let It Slide" 
The Under the Iron Sea DVD includes bass recording sessions of this song. It was planned to be a track on the album, but became a B-side instead. It did appear on the Japanese version of Under the Iron Sea as the closing track.

"He Used to Be a Lovely Boy" 
Following a melancholic ballad style, the song suggests a reference to Chaplin by Rice-Oxley. This acoustic song has been compared by fans to Keane's Christmas song "A Heart to Hold You", and B-side "The Way You Want It".

Track listings

Charts and certifications

Weekly charts

Year-end charts

Certifications

Release history

References

External links 
 Official site
 Keaneshaped - Information about record
 Keane.fr - Information about record in French

2006 singles
2006 songs
Interscope Records singles
Island Records singles
Keane (band) songs
Music videos directed by Kevin Godley
Protest songs
Songs of the Iraq War
Songs written by Tim Rice-Oxley
Songs written by Tom Chaplin
Songs written by Richard Hughes (musician)